Deakin College (formally known as Melbourne Institute of Business and Technology), is an Australian tertiary education provider.  Deakin College has been in partnership with Deakin University since 1996. Since then, over 15,000 students have successfully transitioned from Deakin College to Deakin University.

Deakin College provides the Foundation Program which is equivalent to year 12, and university-level diplomas in the areas of business, commerce, communication, construction management, design, engineering, film, television and animation, health sciences, information technology, and science. The institute offers a pathway to Deakin University for students who do not meet the entry requirements for Deakin University's courses or as a bridge between previous studies and university. All courses are conducted on Deakin University campuses at either the Melbourne Burwood, Geelong Waterfront or Geelong Waurn Ponds, or at its Jakarta, Indonesia campus. Intakes are available three times each year (March, June and October).

The Diploma courses consist of 8 units which are equivalent to the first year of the Deakin University undergraduate degree. This means that once students successfully complete the Diploma and meet all requirements, they move into second year of the relevant university degree at Deakin University. The Masters Qualifying Program offered from 2008 to international students is a non-award program designed to provide a pathway to Deakin University's masters programs in business.

History and philosophy
The institute was established in September 1996 on Deakin University's Toorak Campus.  At the time it was recognised to provide access to post secondary education for both Australian and international students who did not qualify for direct entry into university, but who, in the right circumstances, had the capacity and motivation to complete a degree program.

The College allows students to complete their studies more flexibly, for example if they wish to fast track (eight months) their course rather than do a regular university length course (12 months). The College is now established geographically at the Deakin Campus Burwood in Building LA and the Geelong Campuses at Waurn Ponds in Building KA and waterfront in the Denny Laselles Building.

References

Deakin College website: www.deakincollege.edu.au

External links
Deakin College Home Page
Deakin College Facebook
Deakin College YouTube

Education in Melbourne
Deakin University